Pediatric Clinics of North America is a clinical  medical journal in pediatrics published by W. B. Saunders, an imprint of Elsevier.

Abstracting and indexing 
The journal is included in the following abstracting and indexing services: BIOSIS,  CINAHL, Current Contents/Clinical Medicine and Current Contents/Life Sciences,  Excerpta Medica,  MEDLINE, and the Science Citation Index.

External links 
 

Pediatrics journals
Publications established in 1954
Bimonthly journals
Elsevier academic journals
English-language journals